John Leidlein was a member of the Michigan State Senate.  He was one of those killed in the Kerns Hotel fire in Lansing on December 11, 1934.  Also killed were state representatives Charles D. Parker, Vern Voorhees, T. Henry Howlett, John W. Goodwine, D. Knox Hanna, and Don E. Sias.  The men were in Lansing for a special session of the Michigan legislature.

References

Michigan state senators
Accidental deaths in Michigan
1934 deaths
Deaths from fire in the United States
1864 births